Austnes is a village in Ålesund Municipality in Møre og Romsdal county, Norway. The historic Haram Church is located in Austnes.

There is a ferry connection from Austnes to Kjerstad on nearby Lepsøya island and also to Gjerdet on the mainland. The Nordøyvegen is a planned bridge and tunnel system that will connect the village to the mainland upon its completion in 2022.

References

External links
 Austnes (Møre og Romsdal, Norway)

Villages in Møre og Romsdal
Ålesund